Mihovil Klapan (born 27 March 1995) is a Croatian professional footballer who plays as a midfielder for Opatija.

Club career

FK Senica
Klapan made his professional Fortuna Liga debut for Senica against AS Trenčín on February 23, 2019.

Honours

Club
Lokomotiv Plovdiv
 Bulgarian Cup: 2019–20

References

External links
 FK Senica official club profile 
 
 Futbalnet profile 
 

1995 births
Living people
Sportspeople from Zadar
Croatian footballers
Association football midfielders
HNK Rijeka II players
NK Celje players
NK Opatija players
NK Ankaran players
NK Aluminij players
FK Senica players
PFC Lokomotiv Plovdiv players
FC UTA Arad players
Slovenian PrvaLiga players
Slovak Super Liga players
First Professional Football League (Bulgaria) players
Liga I players
First Football League (Croatia) players
Expatriate footballers in Slovenia
Expatriate footballers in Slovakia
Expatriate footballers in Bulgaria
Expatriate footballers in Romania
Croatian expatriate sportspeople in Slovenia
Croatian expatriate sportspeople in Slovakia
Croatian expatriate sportspeople in Bulgaria
Croatian expatriate sportspeople in Romania